

Eugen König (19 September 1896 – 8 April 1985) was a German general in the Wehrmacht of Nazi Germany during World War II. He was a recipient of the Knight's Cross of the Iron Cross with Oak Leaves.

Awards and decorations
 Iron Cross (1914) 2nd Class (30 November 1916) 1st Class (9 July 1920)
 Clasp to the Iron Cross (1939) 2nd Class (19 June 1940) & 1st Class (9 September 1940)
 Knight's Cross of the Iron Cross with Oak Leaves
 Knight's Cross on 1 August 1942 as Major and commander of II./Infanterie-Regiment 352
 318th Oak Leaves on 4 November 1943 as Oberst and commander of Grenadier-Regiment 451

References

Citations

Bibliography

 
 

1896 births
1985 deaths
Military personnel from Trier
Lieutenant generals of the German Army (Wehrmacht)
German Army personnel of World War I
Recipients of the clasp to the Iron Cross, 1st class
Recipients of the Knight's Cross of the Iron Cross with Oak Leaves
World War I prisoners of war held by the United Kingdom
German prisoners of war in World War II held by the United Kingdom
People from the Rhine Province